Lawrence Awuley Quaye (born 22 August 1984), or simply Lawrence, is a professional footballer who plays as a central midfielder.

Born in Ghana, Quaye gained Qatari citizenship and represented the Qatar national team. He became known as Anas Mubarak after becoming a Qatari citizen.

Club career

Early career
Born in Accra, Quaye began his career with Liberty Professionals. In January 2003 he was signed by French Ligue 2 side Saint-Étienne. He played his first Ligue 2 match and first league start on 8 March 2003, a 1–1 draw with Wasquehal. He scored his only goal for the club on 6 December 2003, scored the only goal of the match against Gueugnon.

Al-Gharafa
He then left for Qatari club Al-Gharafa.

He played 5 times in 2006 AFC Champions League, and scored twice (1 goal each) against Al-Karamah on matchday 3 & 4. He missed matchday 5 due to injury.

He also a regular starter in 2008 and 2009 edition, played 4 and 5 games respectively. In 2010 edition, he only played in the both legs of the quarter-finals, losing to Al-Hilal 4–5 in aggregate.

International career
He played for the Black Starlets at 2001 Meridian Cup, including a 1–1 draw with Portugal U18, losing to Italy U18 0–1 as captain. and losing 0–2 to Spain.

In 2010, he changed to play for Qatar at 2011 AFC Asian Cup, which Qatar as host. He capped for his adoptive nation in warm-up friendlies, against Haiti, Egypt, Estonia, Iran and North Korea. He also played all 3 matches against Kuwait, Yemen and Saudi Arabia in 2010 Gulf Cup of Nations.
He was the starting central midfielder in all 3 group stage matches and in the quarter-finals, all partnered with Wesam Rizik. After the cup, he played against Russia to prepare for the 2014 FIFA World Cup qualification (AFC). He also capped for Qatar in an unofficial friendly against FC Lausanne-Sport and FC Bayern Munich.

Personal life
Lawrence is the brother of Abdullah Quaye (born Awuley Quaye Jr.). He is the son of ex Olympics & Ghanaian international defender Awuley Quaye, Sr.

Career statistics

Club 
Statistics accurate as of 16 March 2023

1Includes Emir of Qatar Cup.

2Includes Sheikh Jassem Cup.

3Includes AFC Champions League.

Honours
Saint-Étienne
 Ligue 2: 2004

Al-Gharafa
 Qatar Stars League: 2005, 2008, 2009, 2010
 Emir of Qatar Cup: 2009
 Qatari Stars Cup: 2009
 Qatar Crown Prince Cup: 2010
 Sheikh Jassem Cup: 2006, 2008

References

External links
  
 
 
 
 

Ghanaian footballers
Qatari footballers
Qatar international footballers
2011 AFC Asian Cup players
Ligue 2 players
AS Saint-Étienne players
Al-Gharafa SC players
Al-Markhiya SC players
Umm Salal SC players
Association football midfielders
Expatriate footballers in France
Footballers from Accra
1984 births
Living people
Qatar Stars League players
Ghanaian emigrants to Qatar
Naturalised citizens of Qatar